Tectarius niuensis is a species of sea snail, a marine gastropod mollusk in the family Littorinidae, the winkles or periwinkles.

Description

Distribution

References

 Reid D.G. & Geller J.B. (1997). A new ovoviviparious species of Tectarius (Gastropoda: Littorinidae) from Niue, South Pacific, with a molecular phylogeny of the genus. Journal of Molluscan Studies 63:207–233.
 Reid D.G. & Mak Y.-M. (1998). Additions and corrections to the Taxonomy of the genus Peasiella Nevill, 1885 (Gastropoda: Littorinidae). The Nautilus 112(1):6–33.

Littorinidae
Gastropods described in 1997